The Western Flying Training Command (WFTC) was a command of the United States Army Air Forces.   It was assigned to the Army Air Forces Training Command, stationed at Santa Ana Army Air Base, California.  It was inactivated on 1 November 1945.

History
The West Coast Air Corps Training Center was established on 8 July 1940 by the Office of the Chief of Air Corps as part of the expansion of the training department of the Air Corps.  After the Fall of France in May 1940, the United States began rapidly expanding its military forces, and with the large numbers of men entering the military, the training requirements of the Air Corps were drastically expanded.

As a result, the centralized training of aircrew was divided into three Training Centers, the Eastern, Gulf Coast (later Central) and Western.  Training schools were assigned to the Centers based on the geography of the United States. In July 1943, these Centers were re-designated as Eastern, Central and Western Training Commands.

By 1944, WFTC controlled a large number of training schools in the Southwestern United States, and established several Wings to provide organizational command and control over them, based on both training types and geography.  The schools operated by WFTC part of the Aviation Cadet Training Program.  These were:
 Classification: This was the stage where it would be decided whether the cadet would train as a navigator, bombardier, or pilot
 Preflight: Ground training for all air cadets.  Successful completion meant being assigned to a flying school for training. "Washouts" were returned to the regular Air Corps ranks for reassignment. 
 Primary (Phase I): Taught basic flying using two-seater training aircraft.  Usually taught by contract flying schools operated by the WFTC
 Basic (Phase II): Formation flying, air navigation, cross-country flying skills were taught.
 Advanced (Phase II): Single or multi-engine aircraft schools for cadets becoming fighter, bomber or transport pilots.  After graduation, the successful Air Cadet received his "wings" and were commissioned Second Lieutenants.  In addition, experienced pilots in the field were sent to Training Command "transition schools" to acquire additional single or mulch-engine flying ratings.

In addition to the American Air Cadets, Cadets from the British Royal Air Force and Free French Air Force were trained in flying skills.  WFTC also operated aircrew schools for Navigators, Bombardiers and flexible aerial gunners.  Radio operators were centrally trained at Scott Field, Illinois.   Other aircrew positions, such as B-29 flight engineers and RADAR operators were also trained later in the war as training requirements presented themselves. This included the first jet pilots in 1945.

WFTC was inactivated on 1 November 1945, being consolidated into the new Central Flying Training Command at Randolph Field, Texas, as part of the consolidation of the Army Air Forces after World War II ended.

Shortly after the end of World War II on 15 December 1945, Central Flying Training Command consolidated with Western Flying Training Command on 1 November 1945, and was re-designated Western Flying Training Command. This reflected the massive demobilization after the end of the war, and the closure of the majority of the wartime training bases. On 15 December 1945 Western Flying Training Command consolidated with the Eastern Flying Training Command.  The single entity became Army Air Forces Flying Training Command on 1 January 1946, with its headquarters at Randolph Field, Texas.

Lineage
 Established as West Coast Air Corps Training Center on 8 July 1940 and activated
 Redesignated Army Air Forces West Coast Training Center on 29 October 1942
 Redesignated Army Air Forces Western Flying Training Command on 31 July 1943
 Inactivated on 1 November 1945

Assignments
 Office of the Chief of Air Corps,  8 July 1940
 Air Corps Flying Training Command (later Army Air Forces Flying Training Command, Army Air Forces Training Command), 23 January 1942 – 1 November 1945

Stations
 Moffett Field, California, 8 July 1940
 Santa Ana Army Air Base, California, 1 April 1942 – 1 November 1945

Major Components

 35th Flying Training Wing  Basic/Advanced Flight Training (California)
 Headquarters:
 Merced Army Airfield, California, 8 January 1943
 Minter Field, California, 11 September 1943 – 16 Jun 1946
 36th Flying Training Wing Primary Flight Training
 Headquarters:
 Victorville Army Airfield, California, 8 January 1943
 Santa Ana Army Air Base, California, 21 December 1943– 1 November 1945
 37th Flying Training Wing  Basic/Advanced Flight Training (Arizona)
 Headquarters:
 Luke Field, Arizona, 8 January 1943 – 16 June 1946
 38th Flying Training Wing Bombardier and Specialized 2/4-Engine Training
 Headquarters:
 Roswell Army Airfield, New Mexico, 8 January 1943
 Kirtland Field, New Mexico, 10 September 1943
 Williams Field, Arizona, 26 February 1945 – 16 June 1946

 80th Flying Training Wing
 Headquarters:
 Las Vegas Army Airfield, Nevada, 25 August 1943 – 16 June 1946
 (No units ever assigned)
 81st Flying Training Wing Classification/Preflight Unit
 Headquarters:
 Santa Ana Army Air Base, California, 25 August 1943
 1104 W. 8th St., Santa Ana, California, 15 December 1944 – 1 November 1945
 83d Flying Training Wing
 Headquarters:
 Douglas Army Airfield, Arizona, 25 August 1943 – 20 December 1943
 (No units ever assigned)

Major Aircraft
 Primary flight training
  Boeing-Stearman PT-17, Fairchild PT-19 and Ryan PT-22 twin-seat, single engine trainers

 Basic flight training
 Vultee BT-13 and Vultee BT-15

 Advanced flight training
 North American AT-6 (single engine); Cessna AT-17 (two-engine)

 Specialized schools:
 Curtiss-Wright AT-9s were used for high performance two-engine training in perpetration for Lockheed P-38 Lightning training
 Beechcraft AT-10s were used for pilots in training for two engine bombers (B-25s and B-26s)
 Beechcraft AT-11s were used for pilots in training for C-47 transports along with bombardier training
 Beechcraft AT-7s were used for two-engine pilot training and also navigator training
 Boeing B-17s and Consolidated B-24s were used for four-engine pilot training
 L-2, L-3, L-4, TG-5 and TG-6s were used for glider and liaison pilot training
 Gunnery training schools flew A-33, AT-6s, AT-1s, B-34s, B-10s and RP-63s for air-to-air flexible gunnery training.

References

Training commands of the United States Army Air Forces
Military units and formations established in 1943
Military units and formations disestablished in 1946